Bivouac is a type of camp or shelter. The term may refer to:
 Bivouac Peak, a mountain in the Teton Range, Grand Teton National Park, Wyoming, USA
 A military camp, or an army camp
 Bivouac shelter including a "bivy sack" or bivvy bag, an extremely lightweight alternative to traditional tent systems
 Bivouac (ants), an ant nest constructed out of the living ant worker's own bodies
 Bivouac (horse), an Australian thoroughbred racehorse

Music
 Bivouac (band), a UK indie rock band of the 1990s
 Bivouac (album), a 1992 album by the U.S. band Jawbreaker
 Happy Bivouac, a 1999 album, and the title-track, by the Japanese band The Pillows
 Tokyo Bivouac, a 2003 mini-album by Japanese artist Suneohair